Jennifer Lynn Azzi (born August 31, 1968) is an American former basketball coach, most recently the head coach of the women's team at the University of San Francisco. Azzi is also a former collegiate and professional basketball player, as well as an Olympic and FIBA world champion. Azzi was inducted into the Women's Basketball Hall of Fame in 2009.

Basketball career

College

Azzi received a scholarship and played point guard for Stanford University's women's basketball team from 1987 to 1990. During her four years at Stanford, the Cardinal compiled a 101–23 win–loss record, and captured two Pac-10 titles.

During her senior year (1990), Azzi led the Cardinal to the NCAA Women's Division I Basketball Championship, defeating Auburn.

Her individual accomplishments included:

 Named to the Kodak All-America First Team in 1989 and 1990.
 1990 recipient of the Wade Trophy and Naismith Award.
 1990—Winner of the Honda Sports Award for basketball
 NCAA Final Four Most Valuable Player (MVP), and the West Region MVP in 1990.
 Pac-10 Player of the Year award in 1989 and 1990.
 Three time All-Pac 10 First Team selection

Azzi graduated in 1990 with a bachelor's degree in economics.

USA Basketball
In 1988, Azzi was named to the Jones Cup team. The USA team ended the competition with a 3–2 record, but that was enough to secure the silver medal. Azzi averaged 5.4 points per game.

Azzi was a member of the USA National team at the 1990 World Championships, held in Kuala Lumpur, Malaysia. The team won their opening round games fairly easily, with the closest of the first three games a 27-point victory over Czechoslovakia. Then they faced Cuba, a team that had beaten the US in exhibition matches only a few weeks earlier. The USA team was losing at halftime, but came back to win 87–78. The USA team found itself behind at halftime to Canada in their next game, but came back to win easily 95–70. After an easy match against Bulgaria, in which Azzi hit three of four three-pointers, and scored a team high 13 points, the USA team faced Czechoslovakia again, end achieved an almost identical result, winning 87–59. In the title match, the USA team won the gold medal with a score of 88–78. Azzi averaged 4.6 points per game, and recorded 15 assists, second highest on the team.

Azzi played with the USA team at the 1991 Pan American Games. The team finished with a record of 4–2, but managed to win the bronze medal. The USA team lost a three-point game to Brazil, then responded with wins over Argentina and Cuba, earning a spot in the medal round. The next game was a rematch against Cuba, and this time the team from Cuba won a five-point game. The USA beat Canada easily to win the bronze. Azzi averaged 6.7 points per game.

Azzi was a member of the gold medal-winning U.S. women's basketball team at the 1994 Goodwill Games, which was held in Saint Petersburg, Russia.

Azzi was named to the USA national team and competed in the 1994 World Championships, held in June 1994 in Sydney, Australia. The team was coached by Tara VanDerveer, and won their first six games, when they faced Brazil. In a closely contested, high-scoring game, Brazil hit ten of ten free throws in the final minute to secure a 110–107 victory. The USA won a close final game against Australia 100–95 to earn the bronze medal. Azzi averaged 4.9 points per game, while recording 16 assists, third highest on the team.

She also won a gold medal while playing for the U.S. women's basketball team at the 1996 Summer Olympics in Atlanta, Georgia.

Azzi played for the USA Basketball National Team in a five-game Australian Tour event in 1998, as part of the Goldmark Cup team. The USA and Australian teams had qualified for the 2000 Olympics, and agreed to play five games in five cities in Australia. The Australians won the first three games and the USA team won the last two.

She was one of six core players selected for the 2000 Summer Olympics in Sydney, Australia, but she withdrew herself from consideration to avoid the extensive touring.

ABL

Azzi began her professional basketball career playing in the United States when she joined the San Jose Lasers of the American Basketball League (ABL) from 1996 to 1999. She was one of the cofounders of the league. Her participation in the league ended when the ABL declared bankruptcy on December 22, 1998. Shortly afterward, she started a training camp for adults in San Jose, California.

WNBA

In 1999, Azzi was selected by the Detroit Shock in the first round (fifth overall) in the WNBA draft. She helped lead the Shock into the playoffs that year.

Just prior to the 2000 season, Azzi was traded to the Utah Starzz. She remained with the team when the franchise relocated to San Antonio, Texas and changed its name to the San Antonio Silver Stars in 2003.

In February 2004, Azzi announced her retirement from professional basketball.

Coaching career
Azzi became the head coach of the women's basketball team at the University of San Francisco in 2010. On March 8, 2016, Azzi lead the Dons to a 70–68 upset over the BYU Cougars in the WCC tournament championship game to earn an automatic bid to the NCAA tournament, which was the Dons' first appearance since the 1996–97 season.  On September 15, 2016, Azzi stepped down as head coach of the Dons to pursue new career opportunities.

Post-WNBA careers
Azzi served on the Board of Directors of USA Basketball for the 2005–2008 term. She was inducted into the Women's Basketball Hall of Fame in 2009.

Azzi is now a motivational speaker, residing in Mill Valley, California.   She also runs a youth basketball camp every summer held at Tamalpais High School called Azzi Camp.

In December 2014, Azzi was announced as one of the six recipients of the 2015 Silver Anniversary Awards, presented annually by the NCAA to outstanding former student-athletes on the 25th anniversary of the end of their college sports careers. The award is based on both athletic and professional success.

Career statistics

College
Source

WNBA

Source

Regular season

|-
| style="text-align:left;"| 1999
| style="text-align:left;"| Detroit
| 28 || 19 || 29.9 || .514 || style="background:#D3D3D3"|.517° || .827 || 2.2 || 3.8 || 0.9 || 0.1 || 2.0 || 10.8
|-
| style="text-align:left;"| 2000
| style="text-align:left;"| Utah
| 15 || 15 || 37.3 || .452 || .417 || style="background:#D3D3D3"|.930° || 2.7 || 6.1 || 0.8 || 0.3 || 1.9 || 9.6
|-
| style="text-align:left;"| 2001
| style="text-align:left;"| Utah
| style="background:#D3D3D3"|32° || style="background:#D3D3D3"|32° || 37.7 || .408 || style="background:#D3D3D3"|.514° || .917 || 3.1 || 5.3 || 0.7 || 0.3 || 2.2 || 8.6
|-
| style="text-align:left;"| 2002
| style="text-align:left;"| Utah
| style="background:#D3D3D3"|32° || style="background:#D3D3D3"|32° || 36.0 || .460 || .446 || .798 || 2.2 || 4.9 || 0.8 || 0.4 || 2.1 || 9.6
|-
| style="text-align:left;"| 2003
| style="text-align:left;"| San Antonio
| style="background:#D3D3D3"|34° || style="background:#D3D3D3"|34° || 33.4 || .403 || .402 || .785 || 2.7 || 3.3 || 0.8 || 0.3 || 1.8 || 7.6
|-
| style="text-align:left;"| Career
| style="text-align:left;"|5 years, 3 teams
| 141 || 132 || 34.7 || .445 || bgcolor="EOCEF2" |.458 || .845 || 2.6 || 4.5 || 0.8 || 0.3 || 2.0 || 9.1

Playoffs

|-
| style="text-align:left;"| 1999
| style="text-align:left;"| Detroit
| 1 || 1 || 40.0 || .154 || .167 || – ||  5.0 || 3.0 || 0.0 || 1.0 || 2.0 || 5.0
|-
| style="text-align:left;"| 2000
| style="text-align:left;"| Utah
| 2 || 2 || 37.5 || .250 || .286 || 1.000 || 1.5 || 5.0 || 0.5 || 0.5 || 2.5 || 4.5
|-
| style="text-align:left;"| 2002
| style="text-align:left;"| Utah
| 5 || 5 || 37.2 || .394 || .368 || .875 || 2.6 || 6.8 || 0.8 || 1.0 || 1.6 || 8.0
|-
| style="text-align:left;"| Career
| style="text-align:left;"| 3 years, 1 teams
| 8 || 8 || 37.6 || .310 || .313 || .889 || 2.6 || 5.9 || 0.6 || 0.9 || 1.9 || 6.8
|-

Coaching record

Personal life 
Jennifer Azzi is married to Blair Hardiek Azzi  

Jennifer and Blair have two children: a son, Macklin and a daughter, Camden.

References

Sources

External links
University of San Francisco profile
WNBA player profile
San Antonio Silver Stars farewell tribute to Azzi
October 7, 2005 San Francisco Chronicle article on Azzi's life after basketball
July 2007 "Marin Magazine" Article on Azzi's life in Marin

1968 births
Living people
All-American college women's basketball players
American expatriate basketball people in France
American expatriate basketball people in Italy
American expatriate basketball people in Sweden
American women's basketball coaches
American women's basketball players
Basketball coaches from Tennessee
Basketball players at the 1991 Pan American Games
Basketball players at the 1996 Summer Olympics
Basketball players from Tennessee
Detroit Shock players
Goodwill Games medalists in basketball
LGBT basketball players
American LGBT businesspeople
LGBT people from California
LGBT people from Tennessee
American LGBT sportspeople
Lesbian sportswomen
Medalists at the 1996 Summer Olympics
Olympic gold medalists for the United States in basketball
Pan American Games bronze medalists for the United States
Pan American Games medalists in basketball
Parade High School All-Americans (girls' basketball)
People from Oak Ridge, Tennessee
American people of Italian descent
Point guards
San Antonio Stars players
San Francisco Dons women's basketball coaches
San Jose Lasers players
Stanford Cardinal women's basketball players
Utah Starzz players
Competitors at the 1994 Goodwill Games
Medalists at the 1991 Pan American Games
United States women's national basketball team players